The Ivory Coast white-toothed shrew (Crocidura eburnea) is a species of mammal in the family Soricidae. It is native to the  Ivory Coast, Liberia, and Guinea.

Taxonomy 
Initially described in 1958 by Henri Heim de Balsac as a subspecies of Bottego's shrew (C. bottegi), it was synonymized with the West African pygmy shrew (C. obscurior) in 2005. A 2014 morphological and genetic study found it to be a distinct species as a sister species to C. obscurior. This has been followed by the American Society of Mammalogists and the IUCN Red List.

It can only be distinguished from obscurior by its skull shape and mtDNA nucleotide sequence. Both species are sympatric with one another in southeastern Guinea, eastern Liberia, and southwestern Ivory Coast.

Distribution and habitat 
It is found in lowland rainforest in southeastern Guinea, eastern Liberia, and southwestern Ivory Coast. It is thought to inhabit lowland rainforest (western and eastern Guinean lowland forests), but little is known of its ecology.

Status 
This species is not thought to face any major threats, and is thus classified as Least Concern on the IUCN Red List. Some populations may however be at risk from logging or land clearance for agriculture. C. obscurior is thought to be more adaptable to anthropogenic habitats than C. eburnea.

References 

Crocidura
Mammals of West Africa
Mammals described in 1958
Taxa named by Henri Heim de Balsac